Home Credit & Finance Bank or HCFB is a private retail bank headquartered in Moscow. It was registered by the Bank of Russia in 1992 under the name Innovation Bank "Technopolis". In 2002, after the acquisition of 100% share by the international group Home Credit, the bank began to work under the name of LLC "HCF Bank" (ХКФ банк).

It ranked 35th in terms of assets, and it was among the top 15 banks in the Russian retail lending market. It possessed the following ratings of Russian and international rating agencies: Fitch — "CC", Expert RA — "ruBBB+" and ACRA — "A(RU)". In November 2020, the bank was headed by Dmitry Peshnev-Podolsky. Under his leadership, Home Credit Bank is preparing for the next step of digital transformation and business diversification process.

Home Credit Russia is the one from two, the largest subsidiaries of the group of the same name. HCFB (including Kazakhstan operations) reported a net profit of 3.7 billion Ruble in 1H2020, as against 15.8 billion Ruble during 2019.

Activity 

Through the wide branch network in Russia (more than 116 thousand points of sale) and online channels, HCFB offers POS loans and installments, unsecured cash loans, credit and debit cards, deposits. The bank is one of the two Russian instalment card issuers in the country and develops its product under the Svoboda brand. Together with its sister companies "Always YES" (Credit Brokerage) and "Forward Leasing" (Leasing), HCFB forms an ecosystem of loans for purchases.

HCFB was the inventor in Russia of the business idea of interest-free instalments, which since 2007 were launched in large retail chains in the format of 0-0-24, 0-0-10. In 2017, the bank was the first in Russia to launch a marketplace of goods purchased in installments. Home Credit Russia had a market share to 22% within POS loans as of end 2019.

In 2020, HCFB was the first to implement the possibility of purchasing goods in instalments directly on the social network VKontakte.

Key indicators 
Table 1. Key performance indicators, per years (in Russian Ruble Millions, MRUB)

References

External links 
  
 
 
 
 Banki.ru : HCF Bank
 

 Gallery

Banks of Russia
Companies based in Moscow
Banks established in 1990
1990 establishments in Russia